Miss Ecuador 2013, the 63rd Miss Ecuador pageant held on March 8, 2013. Where Carolina Aguirre, from Guayas crowned her successor Constanza Báez, from Pichincha as Miss Ecuador 2013. The winner of Miss Ecuador represented her country at Miss Universe 2013.

Results

Placements

Special Awards

Judges 

 Stefanía Fernández - Miss Universe 2009 from Venezuela
 Rodolfo Pérez - Yanbal
 Daniela Kronfle- Jewels designer
 Luis de los Reyes - Renault
 Patty Lamia - President of Ardor Health
 Francisco Ycaza - Plastic surgery
 Douglas Tapia - Fashion designer
 Vanessa Graff - Miss Ecuador 1998
 Bryan Roméro - President of Tec Italy

Contestants

Notes

Returns

Last Competed in:

2011:
 Galápagos
 Los Ríos

Withdraws
 Azuay
 Cañar
 Esmeraldas
 Santa Elena

Did Not Compete

 El Oro - Flor Violeta Quirola Salgado
 Esmeraldas - Andrea Cecilia Macías Huerta
 Guayas - Silvia Córdoba
 Guayas - Rafaella De Campos Vaca
 Manabí - Fabiola Nathaly Novoa Villavicencio
 Santo Domingo - Laritza Libeth Párraga Arteaga
 Santo Domingo - Yuliana Ruíz López

References

External links
Official Miss Ecuador website

2013 beauty pageants
Beauty pageants in Ecuador
Miss Ecuador